Puja Cherry Roy (born 20 August 2000) is a Bangladeshi film actress and model. She debuted as a child actress in the movie Bhalobashar Rong. She appeared in the movie PoraMon 2 as Pori, the female protagonist. She also acted in promotional advertising

Early life and education
Cherry was born at Gazirhaat, Khulna. She completed her secondary education from Moghbazar Girls High School, passing her Secondary School Certificate (SSC) examination in 2019 from Business Studies group. She completed her Higher Secondary Certificate (HSC) examination from Siddheswari College in 2021-22 from Arts group.

Career
She debuted as a child actress in the 2012 film Bhalobashar Rong. Her first leading role was in the 2018 film Noor Jahaan.

Filmography

References

External links

 

Living people
People from Khulna District
People from Khulna
Bangladeshi Hindus
Bangladeshi actresses
Bangladeshi film actresses
Bangladeshi female models
Actresses in Bengali cinema
Bangladeshi expatriate actresses in India
Best Film Actress Meril-Prothom Alo Award winners
21st-century Bangladeshi actresses
2000 births